Moulton St Mary is a village and former civil parish, now in the parish of Beighton, in the Broadland district, in the county of Norfolk, England. It is about 2 miles south of Acle. The village has a garden centre and a car garage. In 1931 the parish had a population of 228. 

Its Church of St Mary is one of 124 existing round-tower churches in Norfolk. It has a canonical sundial on the south wall. The church is redundant and under the care of the Churches Conservation Trust.

History 
The villages name origin is uncertain 'Mula's farm/settlement' or 'mule farm/settlement'. On 1 April 1935 the parish was abolished and merged with Beighton and Reedham.

References

External links
St Mary's on the European Round Tower Churches website

Villages in Norfolk
Former civil parishes in Norfolk
Broadland